Deep Breakfast is Ray Lynch's third studio album, released on December 12, 1984. Upon its initial release, the artist sold over 72,000 albums out of his small apartment in San Rafael, California. After signing with Music West Records, the album was released widely in March 1986. Upon its re-release, the album was universally praised for its mesh of electronic and classical sounds, with several calling it an evolution to the respective genres. Eventually, in 1989, the album peaked at #2 on Billboard's "Top New Age Albums" chart, behind David Lanz's album Cristofori's Dream. The album was eventually certified Platinum by the Recording Industry Association of America in 1994.

Concept

The album's title (as well as the names of the songs) is taken from the then-unpublished The Mummery Book by Lynch's spiritual teacher, Adi Da Samraj. The line in which the album's name was inspired can be found in the album's liner notes: "Evelyn slapped Raymond on the back with a laugh. 'You must be starved, old friend. Come into my apartments, and we'll suffer through a deep breakfast of pure sunlight.'" In an interview with Cymbiosis, Lynch said that "Celestial Soda Pop" was named by a friend of Lynch after hearing that song for the first time.

The artwork used for the album was oil painted by Lynch's friend, Kim Prager.

Reception
Joe Brown of The Washington Post praised the album, calling it an album that is "effective with headphones". Brown particularly praised the song "The Oh of Pleasure", stating that it "uses gradual amplification to give the strange sensation that you're being drawn deeper and deeper into the sound." Bill Henderson of the Orlando Sentinel called the album a "rare surprise", praising its "smoothness and sheer beauty." P.J. Birosik of Yoga Journal called the album "the breakthrough new age pop record". David Stockdale of Sunday Tasmanian labeled the album more than "a modern masterpiece" because "It's an absolute joy to behold." Stockdale also compared some of Lynch's works in the album to Vangelis, especially in "Your Feeling Shoulders". William Ruhlmann of AllMusic gave the album five stars, praising the album's use of "deeply textured melodic structure and a buoyant rhythmic underpinning ". Digital Audio & Compact Disc Review praised the album, believing that it is a "step forward toward maturity for New Age music." Electronic Musician noted that the album is rooted from baroque music, specifically in the way Lynch "constructs neoclassical, melodically beautiful songs of remarkable clarity." The magazine also noted that "Lynch's relationship with synthesizers is a bit different from a keyboardist's" due to his background as a lutist. In an article regarding the artist, Steve Korte of CD Review considered the album a classic.

On June 3, 1989, Cash Box magazine commented that the album became "the only gold album ever by a new age artist on an indie label."

Track listing
Deep Breakfast includes the following tracks. All music is written by Ray Lynch, except where noted.

Personnel
All music composed, arranged, and produced by Ray Lynch except The Oh of Pleasure which was co-written by Lynch and Tom Canning.

 Ray Lynch – keyboards, piano, guitar
 Tom Canning – keyboards on "The Oh of Pleasure"
 Beverly Jacobs – flute
 Ron Strauss – viola

Production
 George Horn and Fantasy Studios (San Francisco) – mastering

Charts

Certifications

References

Ray Lynch albums
1984 albums
Music West Records albums
Windham Hill Records albums
Space music albums by American artists